Ruslan Ilgarovich Fishchenko (born 9 June 2000) is a Russian football player who plays as a defensive midfielder for Rodina Moscow.

Club career
He played 5 games in the 2017–18 UEFA Youth League for PFC CSKA Moscow.

He made his debut in the Russian Football National League for FC Veles Moscow on 1 August 2020 in a game against FC Tekstilshchik Ivanovo, as a starter.

On 11 June 2021, he signed a long-term contract with Russian Premier League club FC Ufa, reuniting with his former Veles coach Aleksei Stukalov. He made his RPL debut for Ufa on 25 July 2021 in a game against PFC CSKA Moscow.

Career statistics

Notes

References

External links
 
 
 Profile by Russian Football National League

2000 births
Footballers from Moscow
Living people
Russian footballers
Association football midfielders
FC Rostov players
FC Veles Moscow players
FC Ufa players
Russian Premier League players
Russian First League players
Russian Second League players